The prime minister of Thailand (literally 'chief minister of state') is the head of government of Thailand. The prime minister is also the chairman of the cabinet of Thailand and represents the government at home and the country abroad.

The post of prime minister has existed since the Siamese Revolution of 1932 and Siam's first constitution. Throughout the post's existence, it has mostly been occupied by military leaders from the Royal Thai Army, three holding the rank of field marshal and seven the rank of general. 

The current prime minister, former general Prayut Chan-o-cha, was formally appointed to the office on 24 August 2014; he previously served as the de facto head of government as leader of the National Council for Peace and Order after the coup d'état on 22 May 2014. A Constitutional Court ruling on the matter of his 8-year term limit led to Prayut's suspension from 24 August to 30 September 2022, during which his deputy prime minister, Prawit Wongsuwan served as acting prime minister of Thailand.

Note: The list includes leaders of military juntas and acting prime ministers. However, they are not counted in the official list as provided by the Royal Thai Government.

List of prime ministers 
Colour key (for political coalitions/parties):

General categories:  (12)  (7) 

Defunct political parties:

Pre–1950:  (3)  (2)  (1) 

1950–1975:  (1)  (1)  (0)  (1) 

1975–2000:  (1)  (0) 

Post–2000:  (2)  (1)  (2) 

Active political parties:  (6)  (1)  (1)  (1)  (1)

Timeline

See also

 Prime Minister of Thailand
 Constitution of Thailand
 Government of Thailand
 Office of the Prime Minister (Thailand)
 Cabinet of Thailand

Notes

References
Citations

Links

External links
 LIST OF THAI PRIME MINISTERS with names also in Thai

Thailand
 
 
Prime Minister